Ronald P. Sokol (born 1939), lawyer and writer, is a member of the bar in the United States and France. He and his wife live in Aix-en-Provence, France. He is the author of Federal Habeas Corpus and Justice after Darwin and op-ed contributor to the International Herald Tribune and the Christian Science Monitor.

Early life and education
Born in Milwaukee, Wisconsin, Sokol attended Duke University for three years, leaving without a degree to study law at the University of Virginia where he was admitted in 1959. There he met Daniel Meador, then James Monroe Professor and later Associate Attorney-General under President Carter.  The correspondence between Sokol and Meador continued for 45 years and is now collected at the University of Virginia.  Meador regularly argued before the U.S. Supreme Court and was a practitioner and scholar of constitutional litigation.

Career at Virginia
Sokol graduated from Virginia in 1962 and was admitted to practice in Wisconsin, but chose to stay on at Virginia to study under Meador and to pursue civil rights studies and international law. In 1963 Sokol obtained an LLM degree finishing a thesis that was published as The Puzzle of Equality. While working with Meador Sokol began to appear before the U.S. Court of Appeals for the 4th Circuit as court-appointed counsel in habeas corpus cases. Upon completing his degree the university invited him to join the faculty as lecturer in Appellate Practice and Director of an Appellate Legal Aid program which Sokol initiated. For three years Sokol regularly appeared before the 4th Circuit which singled him out in its published opinions as outstandingly able counsel.

In 1965 Sokol drew on his experience to publish A Handbook of Federal Habeas Corpus, the first book on the subject since the 19th century. It was followed by a second edition in 1969.

Career in France
In 1966 Sokol resigned from the university and moved to Paris where he began work on Justice after Darwin published in 1975. It was one of the first works to bring evolutionary theory to bear on legal problems and on justice in particular and displayed an early interdisciplinary approach to the study of law. In 1967 Sokol moved to Tokyo to study Japanese where he met his wife. They communicated in Japanese until coming to France in December, 1968.

In 1970 Sokol and his wife moved to Aix-en-Provence where they have lived since. In 1973 he was admitted to practice in France and set up his own firm. He continues to argue cases throughout France and to counsel individuals, estates, non-profit foundations, and corporations.

In addition to teaching at the University of Virginia, Sokol has lectured at the University of Aix-en-Provence, the Institute of American Universities in Aix-en-Provence, the Ecoles des Mines in Saint-Étienne, the University of Buskerud in Norway and Imperial College, London. He and his wife have four sons who live in London.

Bibliography
Books
 The Puzzle of Equality (1967)
 A Handbook of Federal Habeas Corpus (1965)
 The Law-Abiding Policeman (1966)
 Language and Litigation (1967)
 Federal Habeas Corpus (1969)
 The Law-Abiding Policeman, 2nd edition (1969)
 A Short Guide to Aix-en-Provence (1972)
 A Short Guide to Arles (1973)
 Justice After Darwin (1975)
 Modern Legal Systems Cyclopedia, The French Law-Making Process (1990)

Selected Articles
 The Political Trial: Courtroom as Stage, History as Critic, New Literary History, vol, 2 (Spring, 1971).
 Reforming the French Legal Profession, International Lawyer, vol. 26 (Winter, 1992)
 Freedom of Expression in France: The Mitterrand-Dr. Gubler Affair, Tulane Journal of International & Comparative Law, vol. 7 (Spring, 1999)
 French Enforcement of the Hague Convention on International Child Abduction: A Case Study, Tulane Journal of International & Comparative Law, vol. 11 (Spring, 2003)

References

1939 births
Living people
American expatriates in France
American legal writers
Duke University alumni
Writers from Milwaukee
University of Virginia School of Law alumni
University of Virginia faculty
Lawyers from Milwaukee